Trollius altaicus is an ornamental plant of the family Ranunculaceae, which is native of Asia and Europe. This plant usually grows in wet places, specially in valleys.

References

External links
Trollius  altaicus (photo)

altaicus
Flora of Asia
Flora of Europe